Quintin Morris (born January 21, 1999) is an American football tight end for the Buffalo Bills of the National Football League (NFL). He played college football at Bowling Green.

College career
Morris played  for the Bowling Green Falcons for four seasons. He finished his collegiate career with 125 receptions for 1,529 yards and 13 touchdowns in 40 games played.

Professional career
Morris was signed by the Buffalo Bills as an undrafted free agent on May 1, 2021. He was waived during final roster cuts on August 31, 2021, but was signed to the team's practice squad the next day. Morris was elevated to the active roster on October 26, 2021, for the team's Week 9 game against the Jacksonville Jaguars and made his NFL debut in the game. After the Bills were eliminated in the Divisional Round of the 2021 playoffs, he signed a reserve/future contract on January 24, 2022. Following the 2022 NFL preseason, Morris was named to the official 53-man roster to begin the season, edging out former Buccaneer's first round pick OJ Howard for a roster spot.

On September 19, 2022 the Buffalo Bills hosted the Tennessee Titans on Monday Night Football where Morris would make his National Football League debut. Morris finished the game with 28 offensive and 19 special teams snaps. Morris would haul in his first NFL reception from quarterback Josh Allen for six yards during the Bills 41-7 victory. In week 5 vs. the Pittsburgh Steelers Morris earned his first career start. Morris would have a career high three catches and 39 receiving yards in a 38-3 victory. In week 15 vs. the Miami Dolphins Morris would catch his first career NFL touchdown pass. In the 1st quarter, Josh Allen would connect with Morris on a 14-yard touchdown. The Bills won the game 32-29, on a game winning 25-yard field goal from kicker Tyler Bass as time expired.

NFL career statistics

Regular season

Postseason

References

External links
Bowling Green Falcons bio
Buffalo Bills bio

Living people
American football tight ends
Bowling Green Falcons football players
Buffalo Bills players
Players of American football from Texas
1999 births